Đặng Thùy Trâm (November 26, 1942 – June 22, 1970) was a Vietnamese doctor. She worked as a battlefield surgeon for the People's Army of Vietnam and Vietcong during the Vietnam War. Her wartime diaries, which chronicle the last two years of her life, attracted international attention following their publication in 2005.

Early life 
Trâm was born on November 26, 1942 in Hà Nội, Vietnam to a family of doctors that had spanned three generations. Her father, Đặng Ngọc Khuê, was a surgeon and her mother, Doãn Ngọc Trâm, was a pharmacist. Trâm was also the eldest of five siblings, which included three other younger sisters and a younger brother.

She went to high school at Chu Văn An High School (Hanoi) and later attended the Hanoi Medical University during college.

On December 23, 1966, Trâm, along with many other civilians, boarded a truck to the Quảng Bình Province and began working as a battlefield surgeon.

Diaries 
One of Trâm's handwritten diaries was captured by US forces in December 1969. Following her death in a gun battle on June 22, 1970, a second diary was taken by Frederic (Fred) Whitehurst, a then 22-year-old military intelligence specialist. Whitehurst defied an order to burn the diaries, instead following the advice of a South Vietnamese translator not to destroy them. He kept them for 35 years, with the intention of eventually returning them to Trâm's family.

After returning to the United States, Whitehurst's search for Trâm's family initially proved unsuccessful. After earning a Ph.D. in chemistry he joined the FBI, but was unable to reach anyone from the Vietnamese embassy. In March 2005, he and his brother Robert – another Vietnam veteran – brought the diaries to a conference at Texas Tech University. There, they met photographer Ted Engelmann (also a Vietnam veteran), who offered to look for the family during his trip to Vietnam. With the assistance of Do Xuan Anh, a staff member in the Hanoi Quaker office, Engelmann was able to locate Trâm's mother, Doan Ngoc Tram, and subsequently reached the rest of her family.

In July 2005, Trâm's diaries were published in Vietnam under the title Nhật ký Đặng Thùy Trâm (Đặng Thùy Trâm's Diary (Last Night I Dreamed Of Peace)), which quickly became a bestseller. In less than a year, the volume sold more than 300,000 copies and comparisons were drawn between Trâm's writings and that of Anne Frank.

In August 2005, Fred and Robert Whitehurst traveled to Hanoi to meet Trâm's family. In October of that year, Trâm's family visited Lubbock, Texas to view the diaries archived at Texas Tech University Vietnam Archive, and then visited Fred Whitehurst and his family.

The diaries were translated into English and published in September 2007. They include family photographs and images of Trâm. Translations of the diaries have been published in at least sixteen different languages.

In 2009, a film about Tram by Vietnamese director Đặng Nhật Minh, entitled Đừng Đốt (Do Not Burn It), was released.

Death 
Tram was 27 years old when she died on June 22, 1970 in Đức Phổ, Quảng Ngãi Province, Vietnam. She and another colleague were killed by a patrol from the US 4th Battalion, 21st Infantry Regiment in a Free-fire zone while traveling on a trail in the Ba Tơ jungle in Quảng Ngãi Province.

External links

  "Trở lại một khát vọng hòa bình"(September 14, 2007)
 "Nhật ký Đặng Thùy Trâm có giá trị toàn cầu và vĩnh cửu" (September 18, 2007)
 "Last night I dreamed of peace", published worldwide by Random House, September 11, 2007.
 Full text of The Diary of Dr. Dang Thuy Tram from The Vietnam Center site at Texas Tech University (scans of original Vietnamese text; English translation removed at request of family)
 "Tram Diaries: Soldiers Preserve Writings of Vietnam War"
 "War's cruel poetry moves search by 2 N.C. veterans" Charlotte Observer (Charlotte, North Carolina), October 6, 2005
 "Vietcong Doctor's Diary of War, Sacrifice"
 "Mother Reads Daughter's Vietnam Diaries... 35 Years Later" (October 6, 2005)
 "The real stuff: what a Vietnamese army doctor saw" (September 22, 2005)
 "A daughter returns home — through her diaries" (October 12, 2005)
 "Best-selling diary transformed into television show" (August 15, 2005)
 "Diarist's mother visits US, holds daughter's manuscript" (October 7, 2005)
 "The Diary of Dr Tram" (February 13, 2006)
 "Day to Day Among the Viet Cong" (August 4, 2006)

Video
 Dang Thuy Tram video from Texas Tech University

References

Vietnamese diarists
Vietnamese military doctors
1943 births
1970 deaths
People from Huế
Women in the Vietnam War
Vietnamese people of the Vietnam War
Women diarists
20th-century Vietnamese physicians
Vietnamese women physicians
Vietnam War casualties
20th-century diarists